Johan Jacobs is an Namibian international lawn bowler.

Bowls career
Jacobs was selected as part of the five man team by Namibia for the 2020 World Outdoor Bowls Championship

He won a triples bronze medal (with Piet Appollis and Willem Esterhuizen), at the 2019 Atlantic Bowls Championships.

References

Living people
Namibian bowls players
Year of birth missing (living people)